Femoxetine (INN; tentative brand name Malexil; developmental code name FG-4963) is a drug related to paroxetine that was being developed as an antidepressant by Danish pharmaceutical company Ferrosan in 1975 before acquisition of the company by Novo Nordisk. It acts as a selective serotonin reuptake inhibitor (SSRI). Development was halted to focus attention on paroxetine instead, as femoxetine could not be administered as a daily pill.

Both femoxetine and paroxetine were invented in the 1970s. Jørgen Anders Christensen's name is on the patents and Jorgen Buus-Lassen's name is on the pharmacology paper.

After Ferrosan's acquisition, femoxetine died from neglect.

In a separate patent, Ferrosan stated that Femoxetine could be used as an appetite suppressant, using ten times the dosage than for paroxetine, 300 - 400mg daily.

Femoxetine has the same stereochemical properties as Nocaine, another agent with a similar structure claimed to have been synthesized using arecoline as the starting alkaloid.

Analogs

Addition of the para-fluoro atom results in a different compound that is a hybrid of femoxetine & paroxetine named FG 7080, which has a separate patent. According to the patent tables, incorporation of the fluorine atom potentiated the 5-HT affinity considerably.
Pfizer made some similar analogs E.g. a Viloxazine type of catechol ether is used, but 4-phenyl instead of based on a morpholine ring.
NNC-63-0780. binds to ORL1 instead of SERT.
 NNC 09-0026

See also 
 Alaproclate
 Indalpine
 Zimelidine

References 

Antidepressants
Muscarinic antagonists
Phenol ethers
4-Phenylpiperidines
Selective serotonin reuptake inhibitors